Boycott is a 2001 American made-for-television biographical drama film directed by Clark Johnson, and starring Jeffrey Wright as Martin Luther King Jr. The film, based on the book Daybreak of Freedom by Stewart Burns, tells the story of the 1955–1956 Montgomery bus boycott. It won a Peabody Award in 2001 "for refusing to allow history to slip into 'the past.'"

Cast
Jeffrey Wright as Martin Luther King Jr.
Terrence Howard as Ralph Abernathy
CCH Pounder as Jo Ann Robinson
Carmen Ejogo as Coretta Scott King
Reg E. Cathey as E. D. Nixon
Brent Jennings as Rufus Lewis
Iris Little Thomas as Rosa Parks
Shawn Michael Howard as Fred Gray
Erik Dellums as Bayard Rustin

Soundtrack
The film soundtrack was issued as a 3-disc CD album on the EMI Gospel label and features recordings by Nat King Cole,  
Dizzy Gillespie, Kirk Franklin and The Nu Nation, Montrel Darrett, Darwin T. Hobbs & Molly Johnson, Beverly Crawford and The Potters House Choir, the Tri-City Singers, Aaron Neville with Sweet Honey in the Rock, Lamar Campbell and The Spirit of Praise, Karen Clark, and BeBe Winans with Stevie Wonder & Mario Winans.

Reviewing the album for AllMusic, Jonathan Widran said: "This exciting, eclectic R&B-driven soundtrack to the HBO film features a mix of classic jazz performances and some of the best sounds coming out of modern pop-gospel music these days."

See also
 Browder v. Gayle
 Civil rights movement in popular culture
 Claudette Colvin
 Selma, another film starring Ejogo as Scott King

References

External links
 
 Boycott at Rotten Tomatoes

2001 television films
HBO Films films
2001 biographical drama films
Films about Martin Luther King Jr.
Films about buses
African-American biographical dramas
Civil rights movement in television
Montgomery bus boycott
Cultural depictions of Martin Luther King Jr.
Cultural depictions of Rosa Parks
Films directed by Clark Johnson
2001 films
American drama television films
2000s English-language films
2000s American films